The War Finance Corporation was a government corporation in the United States created to give financial support to industries essential for World War I, and to banking institutions that aided such industries. It continued to give support to various efforts during the interwar period. The corporation was created by a Congressional act of April 5, 1918, and abolished on July 1, 1939.

Since government borrowing to pay for the war had attracted a majority of private capital, little capital was available for corporations to borrow; the War Finance Corporation was designed to make such capital available. After the armistice in late 1918, the Corporation assisted in the transition to peacetime by financing railroads under government control, and making loans to American exporters and agricultural cooperative marketing associations. The Corporation established agricultural loan agencies in farming areas, and cooperated with several livestock loan companies. Eugene Meyer, a wealthy and ambitious Wall Street financier, was its managing director.

References

External links
 Records of the War Finance Corporation at the National Archives and Records Administration
 Historical documents related to the war finance

World War I
Financial services companies established in 1918
Financial services companies disestablished in 1939
1918 establishments in the United States
Government agencies established in 1918
Government agencies disestablished in 1939
Defunct agencies of the United States government
Corporations chartered by the United States Congress